Robbie Malneek (born 3 April 1983) is a New Zealand rugby union player.

Early career
Malneek was born in Masterton, but moved with his family to Nelson aged eight. He attended secondary school first at Nayland College, where he played hooker, and then, from 2000 to 2001, Nelson College, where he moved to the back line and eventually fullback.

Senior career
He made his provincial debut for Nelson Bays in 2002, and has played for Tasman since that union was formed in 2006. He is currently the most capped player in Tasman's short history. He has also had two stints playing in Italy, first with Parma in the 2007/08 and 2008/09 seasons, and then at Reggio in 2012/13.

Following the completion of 2014 ITM Cup Malneek travelled to Sri Lanka to play for CR & FC during the 2014/15 season. In the Spring of 2016, Malneek played with Mystic River Rugby Club in Boston, Massachusetts in the American Rugby Premiership.

References

1983 births
Living people
Rugby union players from Masterton
People educated at Nayland College
People educated at Nelson College
New Zealand rugby union players
Tasman rugby union players
New Zealand expatriate rugby union players
New Zealand expatriate sportspeople in Italy
Expatriate rugby union players in Italy
Rugby union fullbacks
New Zealand expatriate sportspeople in Sri Lanka
Expatriate rugby union players in Sri Lanka
Nelson Bays rugby union players
Mystic River Rugby players